This article contains a list of virtualization-capable IOMMU-supporting hardware.

Intel based 
List of Intel and Intel-based hardware that supports VT-d (Intel Virtualization Technology for Directed I/O).

CPUs

Server 
The vast majority of Intel server chips of the Xeon E3, Xeon E5, and Xeon E7 product lines support VT-d.

The first—and least powerful—Xeon to support VT-d was the E5502 launched Q1'09 with two cores at 1.86 GHz on a 45 nm process. Many or most Xeons subsequent to this support VT-d.

See Advanced Search: feature=VT-d and segment=server for the full list.

Desktop 

 VT-d on i7 3930K and i7 3960X only works on C2 stepping.

Motherboards

Intel

Gigabyte

ASRock

Asus 

(1) 48 GB with CPU as xeon x5680 and 8GB DIMMs

MSI

Chipset 
 Intel Z490
 Intel Z370
 Intel Z170
 Intel X99
 Intel X79
 Intel Q170
 Intel Q150
 Intel Q87
 Intel Q77
 Intel Q67
 Intel Q45
 Intel P55
 Intel Q35, X38, X48 Q45 
 Intel HM87, QM87, HM86, C222, X99, C612, C226

AMD based 
List of AMD and AMD-based hardware that supports IOMMU. AMD's implementation of IOMMU is also known as AMD-Vi. Please note that just because a motherboard uses a chipset that supports IOMMU does not mean it is able to and the bios must have an ACPI IVRS table to enable the use of it. At least one Asus board is known to have faulty BIOSes with corrupt ACPI IVRS tables; for such cases, under Linux, it is possible to specify custom mappings to override the faulty and/or missing BIOS-provided ones through the use of the ivrs_ioapic and ivrs_hpet kernel parameters.

CPUs 
List of AMD-Vi and AMD-RVI capable AMD CPUs. All Ryzen processors so far (1xxx-7xxx) support it.

Desktop

Server 
 AMD Opteron (3000, 4000 and 6000 series at least)
AMD EPYC Series of Products
Dell Poweredge 710 (4 x pcie 8-way sockets. Needs end opening for 16-way cards). Successfully set up libvirt qemu with Nvidia 1650 for gaming and Nvidia 720 for Kodi running two VMs simultaneously. 7.1 HDMI passthrough and 2160p.

Motherboards

Chipset 
 AMD X570
 AMD X470
 AMD X370
 AMD B350
 AMD 890FX
 AMD 9-series
 AMD A55, A75, A85, A88X
 SR5650/SR5670/SR5690

Tested graphics card 
List of GPUs tested on some VirtualMachine with IOMMU.
 qemu-kvm can't assign VGA and other PCI device at same time, due to SeaBIOS limitations (fixed on git).

AMD 
Note: Newer AMD cards no longer have FLR bug as of 2021. This bug required a host reboot when GPU is in undefined state. https://github.com/gnif/vendor-reset

Nvidia

References 

Hardware virtualization
Computer peripherals